This article includes two lists of Organisation for Economic Co-operation and Development (OECD) member states sorted by their gross domestic product per capita, the value of all final goods and services produced within a nation in a given year, converted to U.S. dollars, divided by the average (or mid-year) population for the same year.

 The table includes data for the years 2012, 2013, and 2018 at the current exchange rates.

References

Lists of countries by GDP per capita
OECD